Thomas Negovan (born November 8, 1971) is a writer, musician, and art historian from Chicago. He regularly lectures on Art Nouveau and Weimar era Berlin cabaret.

Biography
In 1995, Negovan formed a rock band, Three Years Ghost, which released one album, Sidhe (1995), and performed infrequently in the Chicago area until 2003. He has also collaborated with members of the Chicago Symphony Orchestra and R. Kelly, and has recorded and performed under the ensemble name Ver Sacrum.

In 1999, Negovan founded Century Guild, an art gallery and seller exclusively representing artists Gail Potocki and Jeremy Bastian.

In 2006, Negovan released The Union of Hope and Sadness: The Art of Gail Potocki, with an introduction by Jim Rose of The Jim Rose Circus. The  book was an analysis of the Symbolist paintings of Gail Potocki, and also included essays from Richard Metzger and Marina Korsakova-Kreyn, and portraits of Jim and Bébé Rose, Joe Coleman, Grant Morrison, and Claudio Carniero of Cirque du Soleil.

In 2010, he released the catalog Grand Guignol: An Exhibition of Artworks Celebrating the Legendary Theater of Terror, which featured rare historical images (1895–1962) from the Théâtre du Grand-Guignol, the Parisian theater which gained notoriety for lurid exhibitions of violence, death, and debauchery. The book also featured works by Gustav Klimt and Alphonse Mucha, as well as works by contemporary artists Chris Mars, Dave McKean, Gail Potocki, Michael Zulli, and Malleus, some of them being published for the first time.

Negovan has also edited a number of publications, including: Chamber of Mystery: Witchcraft (2007), which featured various artists and authors, and an introduction by Dan Brereton featuring characters from the Nocturnals, and reprints thirteen stories from 1950s horror comics, selected by Negovan; and Nocturnals Volume One: Black Planet and Other Stories (2007), reprints of the earliest of the Nocturnals comic stories, written and painted by Dan Brereton with an introduction by Negovan.

References 

Three Years Ghost (1995). Sidhe [CD liner notes]. Fordham Press.
"Three Years Ghost: Strength of strings". A String of Pearls. Summer 1995 issue.
Lowry, Mark "I Wanna Be Kate" Dallas/Fort Worth Star-Telegram, Monday, September 14, 1998.
Everson, John "For Kate Bush Fans" The Star Newspapers, December 24, 1998.
Press release, "The Ballrooms of Mars", www.cdbaby.com/versacrum.
Negovan, Thomas. The Union of Hope and Sadness: The Art of Gail Potocki (biographical notes), Olympian Publishing, 2006. .

21st-century American historians
21st-century American male writers
1971 births
Living people
Musicians from Chicago
Historians from Illinois
American male non-fiction writers